HMS Avenger was a Type 21 frigate of the Royal Navy. Built by Yarrow Shipbuilders Ltd, Glasgow, Scotland, she was completed with Exocet launchers in 'B' position.

Royal Navy service

With the appointment of Captain Hugo White in 1981, Avenger became leader of the 4th Frigate Squadron. Avenger was a late arrival at the Falklands War, as she didn't leave the UK until 10 May 1982, arriving on 25 May - a record for any ship involved in the operations, and a great distance to have covered in 14 days. The Rolls-Royce Olympus turbines of Type 21 frigates enabled them to maintain high speeds, but at the time the Royal Navy preferred this information not to be publicised. Avenger had averaged 28 knots and the Type 21s became nicknamed the Boy Racers.  Her divers salvaged a 20mm Oerlikon from the wreck of HMS Antelope which was remounted to increase her anti-aircraft capability, referred to on board as "Antelope's Avenger". She also assisted with naval gunfire support during the campaign.

On 11 June she was conducting naval bombardments of Port Stanley in preparation for an amphibious assault by British troops. She directly struck a house where civilians were sheltering, killing three Falkland Islander women and wounding several others. They were the only British civilian casualties of the Falklands War.

During the Falklands deployment, an alarming crack in the ship's hull progressively worsened with the stormy South Atlantic weather. On return to UK, she was taken in for refitting, with a steel plate being welded down each side of the ship to eliminate the problem. At the same time modifications were made to reduce hull noise.

On 4 May 1983, HMS Avenger, and sister ship HMS Ambuscade, were on the Royal Navy 'Armilla' patrol, a permanent presence in the Persian Gulf during the 1980s and 1990s. The Avenger's commanding officer, Captain Peter Woodhead, was returning from a visit ashore in the ships Westland Lynx,(registration XZ249) when it suffered a tail rotor failure and, nose down, plunged into the sea off Muscat, Oman. The Lynx helicopter never resurfaced from its entry into the sea and for a short time there was no sign of the aircrew or ship's captain. As HMS Avenger approached the crash sight the crew observed some green clothed bodies breaking the surface on the water. When it was suggested to the Captain that a Westland Lynx helicopter from the Royal Army of Oman would be taking him and the other three crew members to the nearest hospital in Oman, he informed the medics "there is no fucking way I am getting into that helicopter". Captain Woodhead and the three other crew members survived the incident, with Woodhead sustaining a non-life changing injury to his back.

After the war she remained leader of the 4th Frigate Squadron until 1986.

Pakistan Navy service

Avenger was decommissioned and sold to Pakistan on 23 September 1994, where she was refitted and renamed Tippu Sultan. She was the third ship to carry this name and remained in service with the Pakistan Navy as part of the 25th Destroyer Squadron  until on 27 April 2020 she was expended as a target.

Notes

Publications

 
 Marriott, Leo, 1983.  Royal Navy Frigates 1945-1983, Ian Allan Ltd, Surrey. 

 

Type 21 frigates
Falklands War naval ships of the United Kingdom
1975 ships